The following events occurred in May 1956:

May 1, 1956 (Tuesday)
Israel's Finance Minister, Levi Eshkol, approves the development of the new city of Ashdod on the Mediterranean coast.
Born: Tim Sale, American comic book artist, in Ithaca, New York (d. 2022)

May 2, 1956 (Wednesday)
This is the first time in the history of Billboard magazine when five singles have appeared in both the pop and R&B Top Ten charts. They are: "Heartbreak Hotel" by Elvis Presley, "Blue Suede Shoes" by Carl Perkins, "Long Tall Sally" by Little Richard, "Magic Touch" by The Platters, and "Why Do Fools Fall in Love?" by Frankie Lymon and the Teenagers.
Died: Violet Gibson, 79, Irish would-be assassin of Benito Mussolini, after thirty years in a mental hospital.

May 3, 1956 (Thursday)
The first World Judo Championships are held at the Kuramae Kokugikan, Tokyo, Japan. The host country finishes top of the medal table, with Shokichi Natsui taking the gold medal in open competition.
In the UK, Granada Television begins broadcasting, resulting in ITV's output becoming available in Northern England.
The United States Air Force discloses that a $41 million guided missile production facility will be built at Sorrento, California, for the Atlas launch vehicle. Convair is announced as the prime contractor.

May 4, 1956 (Friday)
The National Monument in Dams Square, Amsterdam, is unveiled by Queen Juliana of the Netherlands.

May 5, 1956 (Saturday)
In the final of the English FA Cup football competition, Manchester City F.C. defeat Birmingham City F.C. 3–1 at Wembley Stadium. It is later discovered that Manchester City's goalkeeper, Bert Trautmann, has broken a bone in his neck during the match, leaving him unable to play for most of the following season.
Norwegian cargo ship Erling Borthen collides with Liberian-registered SS Santa Rosa in the English Channel, resulting in serious damage.

May 6, 1956 (Sunday)
The 54th Copa del Generalísimo (Spanish Cup) football competition opens.
The 1956 All-Ireland Senior Football Championship opens with preliminary matches at O'Connor Park, Tullamore, and Geraldine Park, Athy.
Died: Fergus Anderson, 47, British professional motorcycle racer, race crash

May 7, 1956 (Monday)
The UK's health minister, R. H. Turton, rejects a proposed government campaign against smoking, on the grounds that the theory that smoking causes lung cancer "has not been proved".

May 8, 1956 (Tuesday)
John Osborne's play Look Back in Anger receives its première at the Royal Court Theatre in London, starring Kenneth Haigh as Jimmy Porter and Alan Bates in his first major role as Cliff. A press release describes the dramatist as an "angry young man", a phrase that would come to describe a British working-class literary movement.

May 9, 1956 (Wednesday)
Toshio Imanishi (Japan) and Gyaltsen Norbu (Sherpa) make the first ascent of the Nepalese mountain Manaslu, the eighth highest in the world.
A referendum is held in British Togoland to decide the colony's future. The result was a majority in favour of integration with Gold Coast, soon to become independent Ghana.
Wales's Gower Peninsula becomes Britain's first designated Area of Outstanding Natural Beauty.
British coaster Fred Everard collides with another British ship, SS Walstream off Margate, Kent. Fred Everard sinks with the loss of one crew member.  
British T-class submarine HMS Talent is damaged in collision with an unknown vessel in the Solent.

May 10, 1956 (Thursday)
The French government sends 50,000 reservists to Algeria.
Municipal elections in Leeds and Liverpool, UK, result in overall wins for the UK Labour Party.

May 11, 1956 (Friday)
Died: Walter Sydney Adams, 79, US astronomer

May 12, 1956 (Saturday)
Died: Louis Calhern, 61, US actor; Calhern dies of a heart attack in Nara, Japan, while filming The Teahouse of the August Moon with Marlon Brando.

May 13, 1956 (Sunday)
The 1956 Monaco Grand Prix is won by Stirling Moss, driving for Maserati.
The 1956 Vuelta a España cycle race ends in victory for Angelo Conterno of Italy.
Born: Sri Sri Ravi Shankar, Indian spiritual leader, in Papanasam, Tamil Nadu

May 14, 1956 (Monday)
The Howard Olson sinks, with the loss of six members of her 28 crew.
Harry Pollitt resigns as General Secretary of the British Communist Party; Pollitt was suffering from poor health, and was replaced by John Gollan.

May 15, 1956 (Tuesday)
1956 Salvadoran legislative election: Elections in El Salvador result in victory for the Revolutionary Party of Democratic Unification.
Convent Crash: In Orléans, Ontario, Canada, an Avro Canada CF-100 Canuck of the Royal Canadian Air Force crashes into a convent, killing fifteen people, including eleven members of the community of Grey Nuns.
Six business executives from a firm in Chicago, United States, are killed, along with two crew members, when their company plane crashes near Jeffersonville, Indiana.

May 16, 1956 (Wednesday)
President Gamal Abdel Nasser officially recognises the People's Republic of China; this causes a deterioration in relations with the United States, who continue to support the alternative regime in Taiwan.
Fighting breaks out between French troops and Algerian independence fighters, continuing until 22 May. At the end of the encounter, 24 French soldiers and 67 Algerian rebels are dead.
Born: Mirek Topolánek, Czech politician (Prime Minister 2006–2009), in Vsetin

May 17, 1956 (Thursday)
Born:
Sugar Ray Leonard, American boxer, in Wilmington, North Carolina
Bob Saget, American comedian and actor, in Philadelphia, Pennsylvania (d. 2022)

May 18, 1956 (Friday)
Lhotse, the world's fourth highest mountain, is successfully climbed for the first time, by Swiss mountaineers Ernst Reiss and Fritz Luchsinger.

May 19, 1956 (Saturday)
Elections are held in the Australian state of Queensland. The Australian Labor Party is re-elected and Vince Gair retains the premiership.
The 1956 Giro d'Italia cycle race begins in Milan, with 16 teams competing.

May 20, 1956 (Sunday)
Operation Redwing: The United States carries out the first air drop of a hydrogen bomb, when a U.S. Air Force B-52 Stratofortress drops a 3.75-megaton bomb on Bikini Atoll in the Pacific Ocean.
Died:
 Max Beerbohm, 83, English essayist, parodist and caricaturist 
 Zoltán Halmay, 74, Hungarian Olympic swimmer

May 21, 1956 (Monday)
The first Cork Film Festival is officially opened in Ireland, by the country's president, Seán T. O'Kelly.
Died: Léo Valentin, 37, French adventurer and birdman, failed stunt

May 22, 1956 (Tuesday)
In the United States, NBC's peacock logo is used for the first time, to indicate the quality of its colour television broadcasting. 
Swedish teacher Gunnel Gummeson and her American boyfriend Peter Winant are reportedly seen for the last time in Shibarghan, Afghanistan, before going missing. In 1977, Gummeson is declared presumed dead, probably murdered.

May 23, 1956 (Wednesday)
Pierre Mendès France resigns as France's Minister of State in protest at the Mollet government's policy on Algeria.

May 24, 1956 (Thursday)
The first Eurovision Song Contest is broadcast from Lugano, Switzerland, and is won by the host country. The winning song is "Refrain" by Géo Voumard and Émile Gardaz, sung by Lys Assia.
A partial lunar eclipse takes place.
To celebrate Buddha's Birthday, the 14th Dalai Lama visits India, where he is received by Prime Minister Jawaharlal Nehru.
Died: Guy Kibbee, 74, US actor

May 25, 1956 (Friday)
Elvis Presley makes his first visit to Detroit, where he appears at the Fox Theatre at the end of a US tour.

May 26, 1956 (Saturday)
The French tennis championships, held at Stade Roland-Garros, Paris, end with Lew Hoad winning the Men's Singles and Althea Gibson the Women's Singles champion.

May 27, 1956 (Sunday)

May 28, 1956 (Monday)
A Gloster Meteor NF.Mk 11 overshoots the runway while taking off from RAF Wahn, West Germany. The two-man crew were unhurt, but the plane was damaged beyond repair.

May 29, 1956 (Tuesday)
Born: La Toya Jackson, US singer, in Gary, Indiana
Died: Frank Beaurepaire, 65, Australian swimmer

May 30, 1956 (Wednesday)
The 1956 Indianapolis 500 motor race is won by Pat Flaherty. It is the first event in the 1956 USAC Championship Car season.
All on board are rescued by the Dover lifeboat.
The Hong Kong-registered tanker Lucky Carrier, on a voyage from Chalna to Akyab, runs aground at Fakir Point, Burma. The ship was later towed to Singapore where she would be declared a constructive total loss and scrapped.
Died: George Murray Levick, British Antarctic explorer and naval surgeon (b. 1876)

May 31, 1956 (Thursday)
The Cunard liner RMS Caronia (1947) runs aground at Messina, Sicily; it is refloated the following day.

References

1956
1956-05
1956-05